Francis G. Waters, D.D., LL.D., (January 17, 1792 – April 23, 1868) was a Methodist minister from Baltimore, Maryland, U.S., and a founding member of the Methodist Protestant Church. He was elected as the first president of the church on November 2, 1830, and presided over the general convention, in which the church's constitution was adopted. From 1849 to 1853 Waters served as the second principal of Baltimore City College. He also served twice as the Principal of Washington College in Chestertown, Maryland.

References

 

 

Baltimore City College faculty
Presidents of Washington College
1792 births
1868 deaths
American Methodist clergy
People from Baltimore
19th-century American educators
19th-century Methodists
19th-century American clergy